Border Line is a 2002 drama film, and the feature film debut of Korean-Japanese film director Sang-il Lee.  It observes the lives of three un-related characters, a son, a father and a mother, each of whom has a troubled family background.

The film is largely a character study, structured in a style of a Robert Altman movie, showing a number of different sub-plots unfold over the course of a few days.  The shooting-style adopted is often similar to that of Yasujirō Ozu.

The cast includes Tetsu Sawaki (Shuji Matsuda, the 17-year-old high school student), Yumi Asō (Aikawa, the convenience store clerk), Ken Mitsuishi (the middle-aged yakuza), and Jun Murakami (Kurosawa, the taxi driver).

Plot
The film opens with Matsuda being uncooperative at school. A radio broadcast reveals that he then murders his father and runs away on his bike.  The next morning a drunken Kurosawa runs him over in his taxi.  Feeling guilty about the accident, he is soon driving Matsuda to northern Japan.  Matsuda remains uncommunicative and unfriendly.

Aikawa is a convenience store clerk with a son at elementary school and a husband who has abandoned the family after losing his job.  Her son fakes illness to avoid school.  She later discovers that he is being bullied.  She becomes increasingly stressed by financial and family worries, and eventually attempts a bank robbery and kidnaps one of her son's bullies to teach him a lesson.

The middle-aged Yakuza finds that his partner has stolen his boss's money to pay for an operation for his daughter.  He is given one week to find his partner and recover the money.  He finds and reluctantly executes him, only to steal the money himself and give it to the widow.

He saves Matsuda from suicide, and, recognizing another troubled person on the run, invites him to stay with him at the deserted house he is using.  The pair form a friendship like father and son.  However, the gangsters track him down and kill him.

Matsuda goes to Hakodate, Hokkaido to trace the Yakuza's estranged daughter, now earning money as a prostitute.

At the end of the film, Kurosawa appears in Hokkaido, carrying a middle-aged female passenger in his taxi.  She meets Matsuda on the beach.  She may be his mother.

External links

2002 films
2000s Japanese-language films
Films directed by Sang-il Lee
Yakuza films
2000s Japanese films